Thomas Eugene Gaddis (September 14, 1908 – October 10, 1984) was an American writer most noted for his biography, Birdman of Alcatraz (1955), about convicted murderer Robert Stroud. It was adapted as a 1962 film of the same name, starring Burt Lancaster.

Early life and education
Born in Denver, Colorado, Gaddis attended local schools before college.

Career 
In his early career, Gaddis served seven years as a Los Angeles probation officer and taught adult classes at night school for around 12 years. He wrote many non-fiction books, mostly biographies. 

He wrote Birdman of Alcatraz (1955), for which he was well-known. He also wrote about another convict, in Killer: A Journal of Murder (1970), co-written with James O. Long, about alleged serial killer Carl Panzram.

Birdman of Alcatraz 
Gaddis published Birdman of Alcatraz in 1955. It is considered one of the nation's notable prison biographies. He explored the life of Robert Stroud, a grandson of a federal judge. Stroud was convicted of murder in Alaska and first sentenced to Leavenworth Federal prison in Kansas. After stabbing a guard to death in prison, Stroud was sentenced to life imprisonment in solitary confinement. 

While in solitary in Leavenworth, Stroud became an expert on birds. He cared for them in his cell and learned independently about how to treat their diseases. He wrote Stroud's Digest of the Diseases of Birds in Leavenworth from 1939 to 1941. After he was transferred to Alcatraz, he was not allowed to keep any birds.

Gaddis's book was loosely adapted as the 1962 film Birdman of Alcatraz, starring Burt Lancaster as Stroud. Gaddis was portrayed by Edmond O'Brien.

Gaddis is known for the following quote:

Later career 
Later in life, Gaddis worked as an educator at Reed College from 1962 to 1965, as well as a court consultant and psychologist, in addition to writing.

Death 
Gaddis died in Portland, Oregon on October 10, 1984 at age 76.

References

1908 births
1984 deaths
American male biographers
American non-fiction crime writers
Writers from Denver
Writers from Portland, Oregon
20th-century American biographers
20th-century American male writers